Brooke Carol Wilberger (February 20, 1985 – May 25, 2004) was an American student from the state of Oregon who was abducted and later murdered. Her disappearance was covered by the national media; her murder investigation was one of the most publicized in Oregon's history.

Early life
Brooke Wilberger was born in Fresno, California, on February 20, 1985, to Greg and Cammy Wilberger. She had three sisters and two brothers. Described as a devout member of the Church of Jesus Christ of Latter-day Saints, Wilberger was a graduate of Elmira High School near Eugene, Oregon. She had just completed her freshman year at Brigham Young University in Provo, Utah, at the time of her abduction. During that time, her boyfriend, Justin Blake, was serving as a Mormon missionary in Venezuela.

Disappearance
At the time of her disappearance, Wilberger was on summer vacation, visiting and working for one of her sisters in Corvallis, Oregon. On the morning of May 24, 2004, Wilberger was last seen cleaning lamp posts in the parking lot of the Oak Park Apartments, which her sister and brother-in-law managed, on the edge of the Oregon State University campus.

Investigation

Initial efforts

When Wilberger disappeared, the police began investigating immediately – against normal procedure. Lt. Ron Noble of the Corvallis Police Department said, "Normally, we would wait. Because adults can come and go as they please, and we would normally wait to see if she showed up maybe the next day." However, in this case, police officials agreed with the family that Wilberger was not the type of girl to disappear on her own. The Wilbergers' LDS ward organized a search by citizens of Corvallis.

The investigation initially centered on Sung Koo Kim, who was named as "person of interest" in the disappearance. Kim was later dropped as a suspect, but received an 11-year prison sentence for multiple counts of burglary and theft of women's personal property in Yamhill County, crimes uncovered while he was being investigated for the Wilberger disappearance. He was released in December 2012 after serving about seven years.

Joel Patrick Courtney
On November 30, 2004, a University of New Mexico foreign exchange student was beaten and raped before escaping and identified Joel Patrick Courtney as her attacker. On September 12, 2007, Courtney pleaded guilty to the attack. Courtney's plea agreement called for a prison sentence of up to 18 years, plus 5 to 20 years on parole.

Police eventually linked Courtney, a native of Beaverton, Oregon, to Wilberger's disappearance. In August 2005, he was charged on 19 counts of aggravated murder, kidnapping, sexual abuse, rape and sodomy. Court documents released in 2008 revealed details showing that Courtney was in Corvallis when Wilberger disappeared and that a green van he was driving was spotted by several people, including an OSU employee who identified him from a photo lineup. Officials said that Wilberger's DNA was found inside the van, along with her hair.

Courtney was extradited to Benton County, Oregon, on April 8, 2008. He was scheduled for his first appearance on April 9, 2008, at the Benton County Courthouse,
facing 14 counts including aggravated murder, two counts of kidnapping and single counts of rape, sodomy and sexual abuse in connection with Wilberger's disappearance. Charges were filed despite the absence of the body of the alleged victim at the time; the prosecutor in the case announced that he would seek the death penalty. The FBI had briefly considered Courtney a suspect in two to three disappearances under investigation, but have since eliminated him as a suspect.

It was revealed through court deposition and Courtney's confession that he had abducted Wilberger from the Oak Park Apartments parking lot on the morning of May 24, 2004. He then drove her into the woods outside of town. He returned to town to buy food while he still had Wilberger bound in his van. According to Courtney, he kept her alive throughout the night before raping her the next morning. He then bludgeoned her to death when she tried to fight off the rape.

Conviction
Courtney's attorneys worked towards a trial, as well as towards a speedier resolution. The trial was set for February 1, 2010. He was expected to be charged in connection with the unrelated kidnapping, attempted sexual assault and attempted murder of two Oregon State University students, the same day Wilberger went missing.

On September 21, 2009, Courtney pleaded guilty to aggravated murder, the only crime subject to capital punishment in Oregon, and was sentenced to life imprisonment without the possibility of parole. The deal spared Courtney from the death penalty, in exchange for providing information about the location of Wilberger's body. In addition, the deal also called for Courtney to be imprisoned in his home state, New Mexico, instead of Oregon where the crime was committed.

The Benton County District Attorney announced the recovery of Wilberger's body (without specifics or its location) in a press conference the day of Courtney's confession. It was later revealed that her remains had been concealed in the woods on an abandoned logging road between Blodgett and Wren, located in the Oregon Coast Range.

Media coverage
The Wilberger case was covered several times on the Fox television program America's Most Wanted between 2004 and 2006. The Montel Williams Show interviewed three of Wilberger's siblings, Shannon, Spencer and Jessica, which aired November 29, 2004. The ABC News program 20/20 examined Wilberger's disappearance along with that of Maura Murray on March 17, 2006.

The Investigation Discovery Channel portrayed the Wilberger story on three different series:

Dateline NBC aired a two-hour special on the case on February 4, 2011. The Oxygen channel documentary series It Takes A Killer also covered the case on January 6, 2017.

See also
List of solved missing person cases

References

External links
America's Most Wanted  Brooke Wilberger at inarchive.com
Joel Courtney Predator Writing at crimelibrary.com (archived)

2004 in Oregon
2004 murders in the United States
Corvallis, Oregon
Deaths by beating in the United States
Deaths by person in Oregon
Formerly missing people
History of women in Oregon
Incidents of violence against women
Kidnappings in the United States
May 2004 events in the United States
Missing person cases in Oregon
Murder in Oregon